Mouhcine Iajour (born 14 June 1986) is a Moroccan football striker who currently plays for RS Berkane and the Moroccan national team.

In 2013, Iajour became the first African footballer to be FIFA Club World Cup's top scorer and Bronze Ball, advancing with Raja Casablanca into the final played against European champions Bayern Munich. Previously, only Congolese Dioko Kaluyituka won the Silver Ball in 2010.

Club career

Raja Casablanca

Iajour began his career at his hometown club Raja Casablanca, in 2003. After staying there for four years, he moved to FC Chiasso.

FC Chiasso
In August 2007 when the Arabian Clubs Tournament was finished, Mouhcine decided to stay in Switzerland without the permission of his club Raja Casablanca. On 28 October 2007, Iajour has appeared for the first time in official match with the team of FC Chiasso.

Return to Raja Casablanca
He returned to Raja Casablanca in 2012. After a season, he won his first league title with Raja. In 2013, Raja qualified to FIFA Club World Cup as league champions of host country. On 11 December 2013, Iajour scored a goal in the 2–1 victory against Auckland City FC, in the play-off for quarter finals. His team eventually defeated Monterrey with 2–1 in the quarter finals to pass in the semi-finals. On 18 December 2013, he scored a goal in the historical 3–1 victory against Atletico Mineiro in the semi-finals. But in the final, Raja Casablanca was defeated by UEFA Champions League holders, Bayern Munich with 2–0. Iajour become one of the FIFA Club World Cup top scorers for 2013, together with Dario Conca, César Delgado and Ronaldinho. He received the FIFA Club World Cup bronze ball.

Damac
On 21 July 2019, Iajour joined the newly promoted Damac in the Saudi Professional League.

RS Berkane
In January 2020, Iajour returned to Morocco to play for RS Berkane.

International career

Youth
In the 2005 FIFA World Youth Championship Iajour has scored three goals and helped Morocco to move to the semi-finals, where they were defeated 3–0 by Nigeria. Morocco ended the tournament in fourth place after a 2–1 loss to Brazil.

Senior
In January 2014, coach Hassan Benabicha, invited him to be a part of the Moroccan squad for the 2014 African Nations Championship. He helped the team to top group B after drawing with Burkina Faso and Zimbabwe and defeating Uganda. The team was eliminated from the competition at the quarter final zone after losing to Nigeria.

International goals
Scores and results list Morocco's goal tally first.

Honours

Club 

Raja Casablanca
Botola: 2003–04, 2012–13
Coupe du Trône: 2005, 2012, 2017
Arab Champions League: 2006
FIFA Club World Cup runner-up: 2013
CAF Confederation Cup: 2018
CAF Super Cup: 2019

RS Berkane
CAF Confederation Cup: 2020
 CAF Super Cup: runner-up: 2021

Individual 

FIFA Club World Cup top scorer: 2013
FIFA Club World Cup Bronze Ball: 2013
Botola top scorer: 2017–18
Moroccan Throne Cup top scorer: 2017
Botola top scorer : 2018–19
 Eagle of the Season in Raja Casablanca : 2019

International 

Morocco
African Youth Championship Golden boot: 2005

References

External links

Guardian Football

1985 births
Living people
Footballers from Casablanca
Moroccan footballers
Association football forwards
Moghreb Tétouan players
Raja CA players
Wydad AC players
FC Chiasso players
Qatar SC players
Al Ahli SC (Doha) players
Al-Khor SC players
R. Charleroi S.C. players
Damac FC players
RS Berkane players
Botola players
Swiss Challenge League players
Belgian Pro League players
Qatar Stars League players
Saudi Professional League players
Morocco under-20 international footballers
Morocco international footballers
2014 African Nations Championship players
Moroccan expatriate footballers
Moroccan expatriate sportspeople in Switzerland
Moroccan expatriate sportspeople in Belgium
Moroccan expatriate sportspeople in Qatar
Moroccan expatriate sportspeople in Saudi Arabia
Expatriate footballers in Switzerland
Expatriate footballers in Belgium
Expatriate footballers in Qatar
Expatriate footballers in Saudi Arabia
Renaissance Club Athletic Zemamra players
Morocco A' international footballers